The orders, decorations, and medals of the Malaysian states and federal territories, in which each state and federal territory of Malaysia has devised a system of orders and awards to honour residents for actions or deeds that benefit their local community or state, are in turn subsumed within the Malaysian honours system. Each state sets their own rules and criteria on eligibility and also how each medal is awarded and presented. Most of the orders allow for the recipient to wear their orders in public, and most grant the recipients the use of post-nominal letters in their names.

States and federal territories orders, decorations, and medals

The State Honours are honours given by state rulers. Johor was the first state to have its own awards on 31 July 1886. Later, the other Malay states did the same.

Federal Territories

The orders, decorations, and medals given by Yang di-Pertuan Agong are:

Non royal states

Malacca

The orders, decorations, and medals given by Yang di-Pertua Negeri of Malacca are:

Penang

The orders, decorations, and medals given by Yang di-Pertua Negeri of Penang are:

Sabah 

The orders, decorations, and medals given by Yang di-Pertua Negeri of Sabah are:

Sarawak

The orders, decorations, and medals given by Yang di-Pertua Negeri of Sarawak are:

Royal States

Johor

The orders, decorations, and medals given by the Sultan of Johor are:

Kedah

The orders, decorations, and medals given by the Sultan of Kedah are:

Kelantan

The orders, decorations, and medals given by the Sultan of Kelantan are:

Negeri Sembilan

The orders, decorations, and medals given by the Yang di-Pertuan Besar of Negeri Sembilan are:

Pahang

The orders, decorations, and medals given by the Sultan of Pahang are:

Perak

The orders, decorations, and medals given by the Sultan of Perak are:

Perlis

The orders, decorations, and medals given by the Raja of Perlis are:

Selangor

The orders, decorations, and medals given by the Sultan of Selangor are:

Terengganu

The orders, decorations, and medals given by the Sultan of Terengganu are:

References

Malaysia and the Commonwealth of Nations